or  is a village in the municipality of Hamarøy in Nordland county, Norway. Korsnes Church is located in the village.

References

Hamarøy
Villages in Nordland